Sir Capel Luckyn, 2nd Baronet (8 May 1622 – 23 January 1680) of Messing Hall, Essex was an English politician who sat in the House of Commons at various times between 1647 and 1679.

Luckyn was the son of Sir William Luckyn, 1st Baronet and his wife Mildred Capel, daughter of Sir Gamaliel Capel of Rookwood Hall, Essex. He was educated at Bishop's Stortford and Caius College, Cambridge.

In 1647, Luckyn was elected Member of Parliament for Harwich in the Long Parliament. He acquired Messing Hall, his future residence, in 1650.

Luckyn inherited the baronetcy on the death of his father in 1660. He was elected MP for Harwich in the Convention Parliament of 1660. He was re-elected MP for Harwich in 1664 to the Cavalier Parliament and sat until 1679. 
 
Luckyn died at the age of 57. He had married Mary Grimston, daughter of Sir Harbottle Grimston, 2nd Baronet. Their son William succeeded to the baronetcy.

References

1622 births
1680 deaths
People from Harwich
Alumni of Gonville and Caius College, Cambridge
Baronets in the Baronetage of England
English MPs 1640–1648
English MPs 1660
English MPs 1661–1679